Nihad Kantić – Šike is a Bosnian singer. He released around a dozen studio albums, mostly on Diskos, but also on Jugoton, ZKP RTLJ, Nimfa Sound and Grand Production.

He is also a member of the jury in Valentino Zvijezde talent show on OTV Valentino. He has two sons.

Discography

He released the following albums:
	
 "Gde Je Žena Koju Sam Voleo" (Diskos, 1982)	
 "Zakuni Se Da Me Voliš" (ZKP RTVL, 1983)	
 "Hoću Noćas Da Te Volim" (ZKP RTVL, 1985)		
 "Volesmo Se Jedno Leto"  (Diskos, 1986)		
 "Na Dlanu Mi Kratka Linija" (Diskos, 1987)		
 "Kad Ti Teško Bude" (Jugoton, 1989)		
 "Hej, Mala, Malena" (Diskos, 1989)	
 "Naše Vreme Dolazi (Diskos, 1990)		
 "Nikome Nismo Krivi" (Diskos, 1992)	
 "Bosnu Pustite Bosancima" (1994)
 "Vesela Kafana" (1995)
 "Odlazim Daleko" (Nimfa Sound, 1996)	
 "Slijepi putnik" (1998)
 "Zbog Te Žene" (Grand Production, 2000)	
 "Samo Ti" (2003)
 "Uživo" (2004)
 "Šarmer" (2005)
 "Stižu Godine" (VIP, 2008)
 "Premijerno" (Top Music, 2011)

References

Living people
20th-century Bosnia and Herzegovina male singers
21st-century Bosnia and Herzegovina male singers
Yugoslav male singers
Bosnia and Herzegovina folk-pop singers
Bosnia and Herzegovina folk singers
Year of birth missing (living people)